Mount Clairvaux is located on the border of Alberta and British Columbia, SE of the Yellowhead Pass. Clairvaux is the French word for "clear valleys.".

See also
List of peaks on the British Columbia–Alberta border

References

Two-thousanders of Alberta
Two-thousanders of British Columbia
Canadian Rockies
Mountains of Jasper National Park
Mount Robson Provincial Park